Dalton is a small inland country town in the Southern Tablelands of New South Wales, Australia in Upper Lachlan Shire.

Location 
Nearby towns are Cullerin, Gundaroo, Gunning, Yass, and Murrumbateman.

Economy
The Monaro region is renowned for its sheep wool industry, notably for the Merino breed. The dry-land farming supports both summer and winter wheat, and some other cereal crops, but agriculture also extends to cattle production for meat.

The vibrancy of Dalton's heyday in the 19th century as a sheep-shearing centre is gone, lost in 1875 when the train line was routed through nearby Gunning rather than Dalton. Today the town is taking on a new role as a rural-residential centre, with generally well-maintained wide streets and churches, a school, a viable hotel (pub), post office services, and a petrol station.

Geology and earthquakes

Dalton has a significantly higher rate of earthquakes and tremors than the background rate for the eastern highlands of Australia, and because their foci are very shallow (usually less than 1 km deep) the damage they cause is often disproportionately high: events as low as magnitude ML3.0 have damaged buildings in the region.

Significant earthquakes centred on Dalton/Gunning include an ML5.3 event on 5 July 1888 that was felt in Sydney and represents the first record of seismic activity in the area; the largest recorded event - an ML5.6 event on 18 November 1934 that was also felt in Sydney and agitated the water in the Manuka Pool in Canberra; an ML5.5 event on 10–11 March 1949 that caused minor cracking in Canberra buildings and damaged the Anglican Church; and the  ML4.3 Oolong event on 9 August 1984 which damaged Oolong Homestead and the Anglican Church.

Several amateur geologists in Dalton and the surrounding region have seismic recorders that automatically send data to Geoscience Australia.

History 
The area now known as Dalton lies around the margins of the traditional lands of the Gundungurra people in the north and the Ngunnawal people in the south. These two peoples spoke similar, if not identical, languages.

The town was gazetted in 1862. The name was derived from the family name of the wife of the then Governor of New South Wales The Rt Hon. Sir John Young; her name was Adelaide Annabella Tuite daughter of Edward Tuite Dalton.

Quartz reefs containing gold were discovered in the 1860s but were unprofitable when mining was attempted.

Historical Buildings
Anchor Lodge of Good Templar's Hall built 1890 and in use until c.1925.

Police Station built 1889

Public School built 1878 replacing an earlier school building dating from c.1860.

Royal Hotel built 1860

Wesleyan Chapel

St Matthew's Anglican Church built 1878.

School
Dalton Public School was, in 1878, under the instruction of Mr. J. V. Moore, and held in a building rented for the purpose, which was very inadequate at the time. As the lease of the schoolhouse was soon to expire, and there was small chance of obtaining any other premises, tenders were called for a new building. The number of children on the roll in 1878 was 60, with an average attendance of 45.

Gallery

References

External links
Gunning Shire

Upper Lachlan Shire
Towns in New South Wales
Southern Tablelands